The Sukhoi Su-5 or I-107 was a Soviet mixed-power (propeller and motorjet) prototype fighter aircraft built toward the end of World War II.

Development
The appearance of the German turbojet-powered Messerschmitt Me 262 near the end of World War II prompted the Soviet Union to develop faster fighter aircraft. Since the USSR lacked a production-ready turbojet engine, development efforts were directed toward mixed-power aircraft utilizing a conventional piston engine-driven propeller for the majority of propulsion with a small rocket or jet engine for bursts of speed.

The Su-5 (initially I-107) and the conceptually similar Mikoyan-Gurevich I-250 were designed in 1944. The aircraft first flew on 6 April 1945 and underwent limited flight testing. It was subsequently fitted with a laminar flow wing and attained 793 km/h (428 kn, 493 mph) at 4,350 m (14,270 ft) with the motorjet functioning. On 15 June 1945, the Klimov VK-107A piston engine was damaged beyond repair in flight. Following acquisition of another VK-107A, flight testing continued until 18 October when the engine reached the end of its service life. No further VK-107As could be procured and the project was canceled.

The Su-5 was a conventional monoplane of all-metal construction. The VRDK motorjet in the rear of the fuselage was powered by a driveshaft from the VK-107 piston engine and could provide an additional 100 km/h (54 kn, 62 mph) of speed for three minutes.

Specifications (Su-5)

See also

References

Mixed-power aircraft
Motorjet-powered aircraft
1940s Soviet fighter aircraft
Su-05
Abandoned military aircraft projects of the Soviet Union
Aircraft first flown in 1945